

472001–472100 

|-bgcolor=#f2f2f2
| colspan=4 align=center | 
|}

472101–472200 

|-bgcolor=#f2f2f2
| colspan=4 align=center | 
|}

472201–472300 

|-id=235
| 472235 Zhulong ||  || Zhulong ("Torch Dragon") is a creature from Chinese mythology with a human face and scarlet serpent body. It controlled the day and night of the world by opening and closing its eyes. It is described in classic Chinese literature as shining a torch over "the ninefold darkness." Name suggested by students at the National Dali School. || 
|}

472301–472400 

|-bgcolor=#f2f2f2
| colspan=4 align=center | 
|}

472401–472500 

|-bgcolor=#f2f2f2
| colspan=4 align=center | 
|}

472501–472600 

|-bgcolor=#f2f2f2
| colspan=4 align=center | 
|}

472601–472700 

|-bgcolor=#f2f2f2
| colspan=4 align=center | 
|}

472701–472800 

|-bgcolor=#f2f2f2
| colspan=4 align=center | 
|}

472801–472900 

|-bgcolor=#f2f2f2
| colspan=4 align=center | 
|}

472901–473000 

|-bgcolor=#f2f2f2
| colspan=4 align=center | 
|}

References 

472001-473000